Annabelle Butterfly Dance is an 1894 short film. It is one of the several silent films produced by the Edison Manufacturing Company starring Annabelle Moore. In the film, Annabelle performs one of her popular dances while wearing a butterfly costume.

See also
 Annabelle Serpentine Dance

References

External links

 
Vernon K. Flaherty and R. Brian Flaherty collection (R9144) at Library and Archives Canada. The collection includes the Butterfly dance.

Films directed by William Kennedy Dickson
American silent short films
American black-and-white films
1890s dance films
American dance films
1894 short films
1890s American films